Frank Arsenault (May 21, 1919 – December 26, 1974) was an internationally known American percussionist, teacher, and clinician in the areas of marching percussion, rudimental drumming, drum and bugle corps, and marching band.  He was a full-time Staff Clinician and Educational Field Representative for the Ludwig Drum Company.  He is also well known in his field for his signature playing style, for his many championship titles, and for his recording of The 26 Standard American Drum Rudiments and Selected Solos.

Career 

Frank Arsenault played rudimental snare drum in the field of competitive drum and bugle marching corps in the 1950s.  He was associated with the Skokie Indians and the Chicago Cavaliers, being credited with both groups having risen to national prominence.  He was a member of the Lancraft Fife and Drum Corps in North Haven, Connecticut.

Arsenault retired from competition in the 1950s.  He then became a full-time Staff Clinician and Educational Field Representative for the Ludwig Drum Company, traveling extensively.  He was inducted into the Percussive Arts Society's Hall of Fame in 1975.

Frank Arsenault gained the title of National Rudimental Champion at the New York World's Fair in 1939 after winning the coveted National Solo Snare Drum Championship. Having defended his title numerous times, Mr Arsenault retired from solo competition undefeated to instruct others in the art of rudimental drumming.

The 26 Standard American Drum Rudiments and Selected Solos

These are the selected solos from the album:
"Connecticut Halftime"
"The Downfall of Paris"
"Hell on the Wabash"
"Old Dan Tucker"
"The Three Camps"
"Grandfather's Clock"
"The General"
Frank Arsenault received longstanding celebration in his lifetime and beyond, by being featured prominently as the solo performer on the 1950s traditional recording titled The 26 Standard American Drum Rudiments and Selected Solos.  The rudimental percussion community granted him a generally iconic status, in the forms of both his audio performance on the record, and in his portrait as a marching corps figure on its cover.  A colorful illustration of this portrait would later be featured on the covers of the Rudimental Contest Series by Arsenault's eventual student, Mitch Markovich.  As the rudiments became commonplace musical practice over the decades, the general rudimental notation was printed and distributed widely and usually free of charge by the National Association of Rudimental Drummers, sometimes featuring Arsenault's portrait.

Originally produced in the 1950s on vinyl record, the recording was updated with a 1982 cassette format and a 2003 compact disc format, each featuring the same contents as on the original vinyl.  These albums are distributed with their own printed copies of the respective rudiments and solos.  Audio samples are available online from the Lancraft Fife & Drum Corps.

In 1960, there was an unrelated publication done by Arsenault's fellow contemporary master educator, John S. Pratt, consisting of the sheet music of just the standard 26 rudiments.

Critical reception
A 1962 Ludwig Drummer Magazine article hailed, "The Frank Arsenault recording of The 26 Standard American Drum Rudiments has become the basic guide for building percussionists in school music programs across the nation."  In 1975, William F. Ludwig called it, "the acknowledged 'Bible' of rudimental drumming" and added, "A recap of Frank Arsenault's formative years describes a progressive sequence of superior achievements."

Teaching
Notable students of Arsenault have included the following:
 Mitch Markovich: internationally famed author of traditional standard percussion classics "Tornado", "Stamina", "Four Horsemen", and more.  He is the only person to ever become three-time consecutive undefeated National Champion, and to become five-time consecutive undefeated Illinois State snare champion.  Markovich briefly took lessons from Arsenault.  Reaching many achievements and accolades similar to Arsenault's, Markovich likewise served in The Cavaliers Drum and Bugle Corps.

Family
Frank Arsenault's late brother, Eldrick J. Arsenault (1923—2004), was also a skilled and respected percussionist, as a fellow member of the Lancraft Fife and Drum Corps.

Death
Frank Arsenault died on December 26, 1974, due to a sudden heart attack.  An obituary written by William F. Ludwig was sent to members of the National Association of Rudimental Drummers.  Another obituary was written by the Percussive Arts Society.

References

External links 
 
 26 Standard American Drum Rudiments

People from Chelsea, Massachusetts
American male composers
American percussionists
1919 births
1974 deaths
20th-century American composers
20th-century American drummers
American male drummers
20th-century American male musicians